Wangcun is a town in Zhoucun District, Zibo, in west-central Shandong province, China, located  east-southeast of Zhangqiu and more than  southwest of downtown Zibo. , it has 41 villages under its administration. China National Highway 309 passes near the town.

See also 
 List of township-level divisions of Shandong

References 

Township-level divisions of Shandong